The statue of Thomas Becket (1970) by Edward Bainbridge Copnall is installed in St Paul's Churchyard in London, United Kingdom.

It was designated a Grade II Listed building in January 2016.

See also
 1970 in art
 List of public art in the City of London

References

External links
 
 Statue: Thomas Becket statue at London Remembers
 Thomas Becket by Bainbridge Copnall – London, UK at Waymarking

1970 establishments in England
1970 sculptures
City of London
Cultural depictions of Thomas Becket
Grade II listed buildings in the City of London
Monuments and memorials in London
Outdoor sculptures in London
Sculptures of men in the United Kingdom
Statues in London